Klaus Blaum (born 27 December 1971 in Sobernheim, now Bad Sobernheim, Germany) is a German physicist and director at the Max Planck Institute for Nuclear Physics in Heidelberg, Germany.

Life and scientific work
Blaum studied physics at the Johannes Gutenberg-University Mainz, Germany. After his physics diploma in 1997 and several research visits at the Pacific Northwest National Laboratory, Richland, Washington, US, he graduated in 2000 as Doctor rerum naturalium in physics. From 2000 to 2002 he was postdoctoral research associate of GSI Darmstadt (working group of H. Jürgen Kluge) and until 2004 Research Associate (CERN Fellow) at the European Organization for Nuclear Research CERN, Geneva, Switzerland and Project Leader for "Mass spectrometry of exotic nuclides with ISOLTRAP" at ISOLDE. In October 2004 Klaus Blaum became Project Leader of the "Helmholtz Research Group for Young Investigators" on "Experiments with Stored and Cooled Ions" at the Johannes Gutenberg-University Mainz. In 2006 he habilitated in experimental physics at the University Mainz about High precision mass spectrometry with Penning traps and storage rings.

From 2004 to 2008 Blaum taught at the Johannes Gutenberg-University Mainz. His achievement was honored with the Teaching Award of Rheinland-Pfalz 2006.
In October 2007 he was appointed as director and scientific member at the Max-Planck-Institute for Nuclear Physics in Heidelberg, Germany. Since April 2008 he is honorary professor (W3) at the Ruprecht-Karls-University Heidelberg, Germany. In November 2008 he was elected as a Fellow of the American Physical Society (APS). After his first term (2012–2014), he was again vice chairman of the advisory committee "Hadrons and Nuclei" of the Federal Ministry of Education and Research (BMBF) from 2018 to March 2020. During the membership period 2012–2019 Klaus Blaum was a member of the DFG (German Research Foundation) Review Board 308 "Optics, Quantum Optics and Physics of Atoms, Molecules and Plasmas". From June 2016 to December 2019 he was deputy chairman of the FAIR/GSI Joint Scientific Council, chairman of the Scientific Committee of GSI and member of the supervisory board of GSI. Since July 2020, Klaus Blaum is vice president of the Max Planck Society and responsible for the Institutes of the Chemistry, Physics and Technology Section.

Main research areas
His scientific work focuses on precision experiments with stored and cooled ions as well as the investigation of fundamental processes of molecular ions. Another main research field is the development of novel storage, cooling and detection techniques for future experiments.

Distinctions and awards
 2004: Gustav-Hertz-Prize of the German Physical Society (DPG)
 2005: Mattauch-Herzog-Prize of the German Society for Mass Spectrometry (DGMS)
 2007: Teaching Award of Rheinland-Pfalz
 2008: American Physical Society (APS) Fellowship
 2010: GENCO Membership Award of the GSI Exotic Nuclei Community
 2011: ERC Advanced Grant for Precision Measurements of Fundamental Constants (MEFUCO)
 2012: Helmholtz Prize of the Physikalisch-Technische Bundesanstalt (PTB) for precision measurements  (together with Anke Wagner and Sven Sturm)
 2013: Flerov Prize (together with H.-J. Kluge and Y. Novikov)
 2016: Gothenburg Lise Meitner Award  of the Gothenburg Physics Centre
 2019: Foreign member of the Physics Class of the Royal Swedish Academy of Sciences
 2019: ERC Advanced Grant for the test of fundamental interactions (FunI)
 2020: Lise Meitner Prize of the European Physical Society (EPS). (together with Björn Jonson and Piet Van Duppen)
 2021: Otto Hahn Prize of the City of Frankfurt am Main, the German Chemical Society (GDCh) and the German Physical Society (DPG) 
 2022: Full member of the Heidelberg Academy of Sciences and Humanities (HAdW) 
 2022: Honorary Member of the Physikalischer Verein (Frankfurt am Main)

Publications (selection)

References

External links
 Personal Homepage at Max Planck Institute for Nuclear Physics in Heidelberg

                   

1971 births
Living people
Experimental physicists
German nuclear physicists
Academic staff of Heidelberg University
People associated with CERN
Members of the Royal Swedish Academy of Sciences
Max Planck Institute directors
Johannes Gutenberg University Mainz alumni
Fellows of the American Physical Society